Bohai may refer to:
Bohai Sea, or Bo Hai, the innermost gulf of the Yellow Sea
Balhae, known as Bohai in Chinese, a former mixed Mohe-Goguryeo empire which existed from 698 to 926 in Manchuria

Locations or areas in China 
Bohai Bay, one of three bays surrounding Bohai Sea, immediately east of Tianjin
Bohai Strait, a water channel between Shandong Peninsula and Liaodong Peninsula
Bohai Commandery, a historical commandery in imperial China
Bohai Economic Rim, economic region around the Bohai Sea and the Yellow River Delta
Bohai Township (zh), subdivision of Shanhaiguan District, Qinhuangdao, Hebei
Subdistricts
Bohai Subdistrict, Dunhua  (zh), in Dunhua City, Jilin
Bohai Subdistrict, Huludao (zh), in Lianshan District, Huludao, Liaoning
Bohai Subdistrict, Panjin (zh), in Xinglongtai District, Panjin, Liaoning

Towns
Bohai, Beijing (zh), in Huairou District, Beijing
Bohai, Heilongjiang (zh), in Ning'an, Heilongjiang
Bohai, Zhejiang (zh), in Jingning She Autonomous County, Zhejiang

See also 
 Bahai (disambiguation)